Scott Syme is an American farmer and politician from Idaho. Syme is a Republican member of Idaho House of Representatives for District 11, seat A.

Early life 
Syme was born in Weiser, Idaho. Syme is a 5th-generation native of Idaho. Syme graduated from Weiser High School.

Education 
In 1976, Syme earned a Bachelor of Arts degree in Business Administration from the College of Idaho. Syme graduated from United States Army Command and General Staff College and also graduated from Combined Arms Services and Services Staff School. He attended University of Puget Sound.

Career 
In 1982, Syme served in the United States Army Reserve, until 2014. Syme has served two tours in Iraq. Syme retired from the military as a colonel. Syme also served as a consultant and advisor for the United States Army.

In 1991, Syme became the owner of Syme Farm in Idaho (not to be confused with Syme Farms located in Weiser, Idaho). In 2008, Syme became the co-owner of Syme Real Estate in Caldwell, Idaho.

On May 27, 2008, Syme sought for a seat in the United States Senate unsuccessfully in the Republican Primary Election. Syme was defeated by Jim Risch with 65.3% of the votes. Syme received 13.5% of the votes.

On November 8, 2016, Syme won the election and became a Republican member of Idaho House of Representatives for District 11, seat A. Syme defeated Edward Savala with 80.4% of the votes. On November 6, 2018, as an incumbent, Syme won the election unopposed and continued serving District 11, seat A.

Personal life 
Syme's wife is Patti Syme (who since June 2020 serves has Chair of Canyon County Republicans). They have four children. Syme and his family live in Wilder, Idaho.

References

External links 
 Scott Syme at ballotpedia.org
 Representative Scott Syme at legislature.idaho.gov
  State elected officials have family ties to Weiser

Living people
Republican Party members of the Idaho House of Representatives
Year of birth missing (living people)
21st-century American politicians